Heiki Ernits (born 24 March 1953) is an Estonian animator, illustrator, and film director.

He graduated from the Tallinn Pedagogical Institute as a teacher of arts and crafts.

He has created 19 animated films and illustrated over 30 children's books. He has received 6 Nukits Awards.

With Janno Põldma, he created the popular character Lotte.

References

1953 births
Living people
Estonian animators
Estonian animated film directors
Estonian illustrators
Estonian children's book illustrators
Estonian caricaturists
Tallinn University alumni
People from Tallinn
Artists from Tallinn